Kõrini! is a 2005 Estonian-German comedy film directed by Peeter Simm.

Cast
 Heio von Stetten - Kaminsky
 Rasmus Kaljujärv  -  Hunt
 Maarja Jakobson  - Stella
 Thomas Schmauser  - Manfred

Awards

 2006: Kinoshock - Open Film Festival for states of the CIS and Estonia, Latvia and Lithuania (Anapa, Russia), Grand Prix - best feature film
 2006: BIAFF - Batum International Art-House Film Festival (Georgia), best feature film
 2006: Listapad - Minsk International Film Festival (at Minsk, Valgevene (Belarus)), special prize by the jury

References

External links
 
 Kõrini!, entry in Estonian Film Database (EFIS)

2005 films
Estonian comedy films
German comedy films
2000s German films